David Ng Lap Seng (born June 1948) is a Macau-based Chinese billionaire real estate businessman, chairman of the Sun Kian Ip Group (新建业集团). He is a member of the National Committee of the Chinese People's Political Consultative Conference (CPPCC).

Criminal investigation
Ng Lap Seng is the subject of an American investigation, and faces bribery, money laundering and other charges, as he allegedly that he paid bribes via intermediaries totalling US$500,000 to former UN General Assembly president John William Ashe.

According to Farrukh Khan, the Program Manager on Climate Finance at the UN Secretary General's Office, Ashe played a central role in the negotiations for the Sustainable Development Goals (SDGs). On 22 September 2014 Ashe launched the Global Sustainable Development Foundation to support the Millennium Development Goals (MDGs) and the SDGs. It was to "support the UN's mission and accelerate the achievement of the MDGs and SDGs".

According to a 2021 report by IPS News, “John William Ashe skillfully set the stage for the SDGs by working with larger countries to create a process for the SDGs that truly had global buy in."

On the 7 March 2015 Ng's Sun Kian Ip Group signed a "cooperation agreement"  with the Director of the United Nations Office for South-South Cooperation (UNOSSC), Yiping Zhou. In April 2015 the Deputy Director of the UNOSSC, Inyang Ebong-Harstrup, met with Ng in Macau. In August 2015 the Sun Kian Ip Group sponsored a High-Level Strategy Forum for the UNOSSC. The Forum was also attended by former President of the UN General Assembly, John William Ashe. Ashe was arrested, along with Ng and others, in October 2015 by the FBI.

Since October 2015, he has been confined to his New York City apartment on US$50 million bail, with very tight restrictions. As of January 2016, two suspects have pleaded guilty. In March 2016, a third suspect, Francis Lorenzo, deputy ambassador to the United Nations from the Dominican Republic, pleaded guilty.

US prosecutors estimate that Ng's net worth is in excess of US$1 billion.

Ng Lap Seng was also part of a Democratic fund-raising scandal when Bill Clinton was president, and is mentioned in the Panama Papers.

In July 2017, the U.S. District Court in Manhattan found Ng guilty of all charges he faced, following a month-long trial.

The Supreme Court of the United States rejected an attempt by Ng in 2019 to argue that U.N. officials do not fall under the purview of the Foreign Corrupt Practices Act (FCPA).

On 16 March 2020 a Petition for Writ of Certiorari was submitted to the United States Court of Appeals for the Second Circuit. The Second Circuit affirmed Ng’s conviction under 18 U.S.C. SS666, “which criminalises bribery of any agent”, and under the Foreign Corrupt Practices Act (FCPA).

On 1 June 2020 “The court held that the word ‘organization’ as used in section 666, and defined by 1 U.S.C. 1 and 18 U.S.C. 18, applies to all non‐government legal persons, including public international organizations such as the U.N. The court also held that the ‘official act’ quid pro quo for bribery as proscribed by 18 U.S.C. 201(b)(1), defined by id. section 201(a)(3), and explained in McDonnell v. United States, does not delimit bribery as proscribed by section 666 and the FCPA.”  

On 17 March 2021 a U.S. judge ordered Ng Lap Seng's release from prison on "compassionate release" saying he would be safer in Macau than in a prison during the coronavirus pandemic. Ng had served 34 months of his four-year prison sentence following his 2017 conviction for bribing two United Nations ambassadors.

On 21 April 2021 Ng Lap Seng returned to Macau. He spent three weeks in a quarantine hotel. Ng had been scheduled to be released from prison on 23 December 2021.

References

Further reading 

 
 
 South-South Cooperation and Chinese Sun Kian Ip Group signs cooperation agreement, 7 March 2015, USA News Online
 On Petition for Writ of Certiorari to the United States Court of Appeals for the Second Circuit, Supreme Court of the United States, March 16, 2020
 One of China's Richest Men Convicted in United Nations Bribery Case: Ng Lap Seng, a Chinese billionaire who wanted to build a U.N. facility in China that would be as big as the one in New York, was convicted of bribery, conspiracy and money laundering charges on Thursday, NBC News, July 27, 2017
 Chinese billionaire Ng Lap Seng convicted in UN bribery case: Tycoon paid inducements to promote ‘Geneva of Asia’ project in Macau, FT, July 28, 2017
 Chairman of Macau Real Estate Development Company Sentenced to Prison for Role in Scheme to Bribe United Nations Ambassadors to Build A Multi-Billion Dollar Conference Center, The United States Department of Justice, May 11, 2018
 U.N. Team Had Cleared Group at Center of Bribery Case: Officials met in April with Ng Lap Seng, didn’t detect any problems

1948 births
Living people
Billionaires from Guangdong
Macau billionaires
Macau businesspeople
Businesspeople from Guangdong
Chinese company founders
Chinese real estate businesspeople
Members of the 9th Chinese People's Political Consultative Conference
People named in the Panama Papers
Chinese billionaires